XMG Studio was a mobile game developer based in Toronto, Canada. The company was founded by Ray Sharma in 2009. XMG made games on iOS, Android and Windows Phone platforms. On these platforms, they made games such as Fashion Star Boutique and Drag Racer World, and co-produced/licensed projects including Degrassi and Ghostbusters: Paranormal Blast.

XMG had partnered with mobile games publisher DeNA to bring selected games to DeNA's mobile social game network. In 2012, XMG collaborated with Shaftesbury Films and its digital media division Smokebomb Entertainment to create an app-based video series known as "Totally Amp'd." Additionally, XMG has worked with Sony and MuchMusic to create the Degrassi and Ghostbusters - Paranormal Blast apps. One year later, in 2013, XMG partnered with startup company, Seeds, to help give microloans to female entrepreneurs in developing countries through mobile gaming.

XMG was the creator of The Great Canadian Appathon, a 48-hour coding competition for college students which had its last competition in 2014. The studio has been inactive on all social media since late December 2016. In late June 2017, XMG Studio was acquired by Highmark Interactive in order to develop games to aid in recovery from traumatic brain injuries.

References

External links 
 

Video game development companies
Defunct video game companies of Canada
Video game companies established in 2009
Video game companies disestablished in 2017